Srednja Vas–Loški Potok is a settlement in the Municipality of Loški Potok in southern Slovenia. The area is part of the traditional region of Lower Carniola and is now included in the Southeast Slovenia Statistical Region.

Name
The name of the settlement was changed from Srednja vas to Srednja vas - Loški potok in 1953. In the past the German name was Mitterdorf.

References

External links
Srednja Vas–Loški Potok on Geopedia

Populated places in the Municipality of Loški Potok